WTRO (1450 AM) is a radio station broadcasting an oldies music format. Licensed to Dyersburg, Tennessee, United States, the station is currently owned by Burks Broadcasting, through licensee Dr Pepper Pepsi-Cola Bottling Company of Dyersburg, LLC (dba Burks Beverage).

References

External links

TRO
Oldies radio stations in the United States